The 11th Satellite Awards, honoring the best in film and television of 2006, were given on December 18, 2006.

Special achievement awards
Auteur Award (for his visionary work as a filmmaker) – Robert Altman

Mary Pickford Award (for outstanding contribution to the entertainment industry) – Martin Landau

Nikola Tesla Award (for creating special effects on the 1978 film Superman that pre-dated contemporary computer-generated images) – Richard Donner

Outstanding Guest Star (Law & Order: Special Victims Unit) – Jerry Lewis

Motion picture winners and nominees

Best Actor – Drama
 Forest Whitaker – The Last King of Scotland
Leonardo DiCaprio – Blood Diamond
Ryan Gosling – Half Nelson
Joshua Jackson – Aurora Borealis
Derek Luke – Catch a Fire
Patrick Wilson – Little Children

Best Actor – Musical or Comedy
 Joseph Cross – Running with Scissors
Sacha Baron Cohen – Borat: Cultural Learnings of America for Make Benefit Glorious Nation of Kazakhstan
Aaron Eckhart – Thank You for Smoking
Will Ferrell – Stranger than Fiction
Peter O'Toole – Venus

Best Actress – Drama
 Helen Mirren – The Queen
Penélope Cruz – To Return (Volver)
Judi Dench – Notes on a Scandal
Maggie Gyllenhaal – Sherrybaby
Gretchen Mol – The Notorious Bettie Page
Kate Winslet – Little Children

Best Actress – Musical or Comedy
 Meryl Streep – The Devil Wears Prada
Annette Bening – Running with Scissors
Beyoncé – Dreamgirls
Toni Collette – Little Miss Sunshine
Julie Walters – Driving Lessons
Jodie Whittaker – Venus

Best Animated or Mixed Media Film
 Pan's Labyrinth (El laberinto del fauno)
Cars
Flushed Away
Happy Feet
Ice Age: The Meltdown

Best Art Direction and Production Design
 Flags of Our Fathers – Henry Bumstead, Richard Goddard, and Jack G. Taylor Jr.
Dreamgirls
Marie Antoinette
Pan's Labyrinth (El laberinto del fauno)
V for Vendetta

Best Cinematography
 Flags of Our Fathers – Tom Stern
The Black Dahlia
Curse of the Golden Flower (Man cheng jin dai huang jin jia)
The Fountain
A Good Year
The House of Sand (Casa de Areia)
X-Men: The Last Stand

Best Costume Design
 The Devil Wears Prada – Patricia Field
The Black Dahlia
Dreamgirls
Curse of the Golden Flower (Man cheng jin dai huang jin jia)
Marie Antoinette

Best Director
 Bill Condon – Dreamgirls (TIE)  Clint Eastwood – Flags of Our Fathers (TIE)
Pedro Almodóvar – To Return (Volver)
Stephen Frears – The Queen
Alejandro González Iñárritu – Babel
Martin Scorsese – The Departed

Best Documentary Film
 Deliver Us from Evil
An Inconvenient Truth
Jonestown: The Life and Death of Peoples Temple
Leonard Cohen: I'm Your Man
The U.S. vs. John Lennon
The War Tapes

Best Editing
 X-Men: The Last Stand – Mark Helfrich, Mark Goldblatt, and Julia Wong
Babel
Dreamgirls
Flags of Our Fathers
Miami Vice

Best Film – Drama
 The Departed
Babel
Flags of Our Fathers
Half Nelson
The Last King of Scotland
Little Children
The Queen

Best Film – Musical or Comedy
 Dreamgirls
The Devil Wears Prada
Little Miss Sunshine
Stranger than Fiction
Thank You for Smoking
Venus

Best Foreign Language Film
 To Return (Volver), Spain
Apocalypto, United States
Changing Times (Les temps qui changent), France
The Lives of Others (Das Leben der Anderen), Germany
The Syrian Bride, Israel
Water, Canada

Best Original Score
 "Babel" – Gustavo Santaolalla
"Brick" – Nathan Johnson
"The Da Vinci Code" – Hans Zimmer
"Flags of Our Fathers" – Clint Eastwood
"The Lives of Others (Das Leben der Anderen)" – Gabriel Yared
"Notes on a Scandal" – Philip Glass

Best Original Song
 "You Know My Name" performed by Chris Cornell – Casino Royale
"Listen" – Dreamgirls
"Love You I Do" – Dreamgirls
"Never Let Go" – The Guardian
"Till the End of Time" – Little Miss Sunshine
"Upside Down" – Curious George

Best Screenplay – Adapted
 The Departed – William Monahan
Dreamgirls – Bill Condon
Flags of Our Fathers – William Broyles Jr. and Paul Haggis
Little Children – Todd Field and Tom Perrotta
A Prairie Home Companion – Garrison Keillor
Thank You for Smoking – Jason Reitman

Best Screenplay – Original
 The Queen – Peter Morgan
Babel – Guillermo Arriaga and Alejandro González Iñárritu
Changing Times (Les temps qui changent) – Pascal Bonitzer, Laurent Guyot, and André Téchiné
The House of Sand (Casa de Areia) – Luiz Carlos Barreto, Elena Soarez, and Andrucha Waddington
To Return (Volver) – Pedro Almodóvar
The Wind That Shakes the Barley – Paul Laverty

Best Sound
 Dreamgirls
Babel
The Da Vinci Code
Flags of Our Fathers
X-Men: The Last Stand

Best Supporting Actor
 Leonardo DiCaprio – The Departed
Alan Arkin – Little Miss Sunshine
Adam Beach – Flags of Our Fathers
Jack Nicholson – The Departed
Brad Pitt – Babel
Donald Sutherland – Aurora Borealis

Best Supporting Actress
 Jennifer Hudson – Dreamgirls
Cate Blanchett – Notes on a Scandal
Abigail Breslin – Little Miss Sunshine
Blythe Danner – The Last Kiss
Rinko Kikuchi – Babel
Lily Tomlin – A Prairie Home Companion

Best Visual Effects
 Pirates of the Caribbean: Dead Man's Chest
The Da Vinci Code
Flags of Our Fathers
The Fountain
Pan's Labyrinth (El laberinto del fauno)
V for Vendetta
X-Men: The Last Stand

Outstanding Motion Picture Ensemble
 The Departed

Television winners and nominees

Best Actor – Drama Series
 Hugh Laurie – House, M.D. 
Michael C. Hall – Dexter
Denis Leary – Rescue Me
Bill Paxton – Big Love
Matthew Perry – Studio 60 on the Sunset Strip
Bradley Whitford – Studio 60 on the Sunset Strip

Best Actor – Musical or Comedy Series
 James Spader – Boston Legal
Steve Carell – The Office
Stephen Colbert – The Colbert Report
Ted Danson – Help Me Help You
Jason Lee – My Name Is Earl
James Roday – Psych

Best Actor – Miniseries or TV Film
 Bill Nighy – Gideon's Daughter
Andre Braugher – Thief
Charles Dance – Bleak House
Hugh Dancy – Elizabeth I
Ben Kingsley – Mrs. Harris

Best Actress – Drama Series
 Kyra Sedgwick – The Closer
Kristen Bell – Veronica Mars
Emily Deschanel – Bones
Sarah Paulson – Studio 60 on the Sunset Strip
Amanda Peet – Studio 60 on the Sunset Strip
Jeanne Tripplehorn – Big Love

Best Actress – Musical or Comedy Series
 Marcia Cross – Desperate Housewives
America Ferrera – Ugly Betty
Laura Kightlinger – The Minor Accomplishments of Jackie Woodman
Lisa Kudrow – The Comeback
Julia Louis-Dreyfus – The New Adventures of Old Christine
Mary-Louise Parker – Weeds

Best Actress – Miniseries or TV Film
 Judy Davis – A Little Thing Called Murder
Gillian Anderson – Bleak House
Annette Bening – Mrs. Harris
Helen Mirren – Elizabeth I
Miranda Richardson – Gideon's Daughter

Best Miniseries
 To the Ends of the Earth
Bleak House
Casanova
Elizabeth I
Thief

Best Series – Drama
 House, M.D.
24
Dexter
Heroes
Rescue Me
The Wire

Best Series – Musical or Comedy
 Ugly Betty
The Colbert Report
Entourage
Everybody Hates Chris
The Office

Best Supporting Actor – Miniseries or TV Film
 Tony Plana – Ugly Betty
Michael Emerson – Lost
Philip Baker Hall – The Loop
Robert Knepper – Prison Break
Jeremy Piven – Entourage
Forest Whitaker – The Shield

Best Supporting Actress – Miniseries or TV Film
 Julie Benz – Dexter
Fionnula Flanagan – Brotherhood
Laurie Metcalf – Desperate Housewives
Elizabeth Perkins – Weeds
Jean Smart – 24
Vanessa Williams – Ugly Betty

Best TV Film
 A Little Thing Called Murder
Gideon's Daughter
High School Musical
In from the Night
Mrs. Harris

Outstanding Television Ensemble
 Grey's Anatomy

New Media winners and nominees

Best Classic DVD
The Conformist
State Fair, Oklahoma!, Carousel, The King and I, South Pacific, and The Sound of Music For the "Rodgers & Hammerstein Box Set Collection".
The Wild Bunch, Pat Garrett and Billy the Kid, Ride the High Country, and The Ballad of Cable Hogue For "Sam Peckinpah's Legendary Westerns Collection".
Flying Down to Rio, The Gay Divorcee, Roberta, Top Hat, Follow the Fleet, Swing Time, Shall We Dance, Carefree, The Story of Vernon and Irene Castle, and The Barkleys of Broadway For the "Astaire & Rogers Ultimate Collector's Edition".
Breakfast at Tiffany's For the "Anniversary Edition".
Cabin in the Sky
Grease
1900
Valley of the Dolls
The Wicker Man

Best Documentary DVD
An Inconvenient Truth
49 Up
Andy Warhol: A Documentary
The Aristocrats
Dave Chappelle's Block Party
Independent Lens For episode "Enron: The Smartest Guys in the Room (#8.22)".
Marie Antoinette
Pornography: A Secret History of Civilisation
Thinking XXX
Wordplay

Best DVD Extras
Mission: Impossible III
Harry Potter and the Philosopher's Stone, Harry Potter and the Chamber of Secrets, Harry Potter and the Prisoner of Azkaban, and Harry Potter and the Goblet of Fire For "Harry Potter Years 1-4".
The Chronicles of Narnia: The Lion, the Witch and the Wardrobe
Corpse Bride
The Da Vinci Code
Good Night, and Good Luck
The New World
The Omen
The Poseidon Adventure
The Towering Inferno

Best DVD Release of TV Shows
The Simpsons For "The Complete Eighth Season".
Alias For "The Complete Fifth Season".
Desperate Housewives For "The Complete Second Season".
Mission: Impossible For "The Complete First Season".
Police Squad! For "The Complete Series".
Six Feet Under For "The Complete Series Gift Set".
Slings & Arrows For "Season Two".
Liza with a Z For "Collector's Edition".

Outstanding Action/Adventure Game
 New Super Mario Bros.
F.E.A.R.: First Encounter Assault Recon
Ghost Recon Advanced Warfighter
Metroid Prime Hunters
Ōkami

Outstanding Game Based on a Previous Medium
 Kingdom Hearts II
Lego Star Wars II: The Original Trilogy
The Lord of the Rings: The Battle for Middle-Earth II
Scarface: The World Is Yours
Star Wars: Empire at War

Outstanding Overall DVD
Superman, Superman II, Superman II: The Richard Donner Cut, Superman III, Superman IV: The Quest for Peace, Superman Returns For the "Superman Ultimate Collector's Edition".
Capote
Good Night, and Good Luck
A History of Violence
Jarhead
Les temps qui changent
Pandora's Box
Symbiopsychotaxiplasm: Take 2 1/2
V for Vendetta

Outstanding Puzzle/Strategy Game
 Company of Heroes
Dr. Kawashima's Brain Training: How Old Is Your Brain?
Galactic Civilizations II: Dread Lords
Mercury Meltdown
Tetris DS

Outstanding Role Playing Game
 The Elder Scrolls IV: Oblivion
Final Fantasy XII
Kingdom Hearts II
Marvel: Ultimate Alliance
Neverwinter Nights 2

Outstanding Sports Game
 FIFA 07
MLB '06: The Show
NCAA Football 2007
Pro Evolution Soccer 5
Rockstar Games Presents Table Tennis

Outstanding Youth DVD
The Little Mermaid
Akeelah and the Bee
Cars
Eight Below
The Greatest Game Ever Played
Ice Age: The Meltdown
Lady and the Tramp
Nanny McPhee
Wallace & Gromit: The Curse of the Were-Rabbit

Awards breakdown

Film
Winners:
4 / 6 The Departed: Best Film – Drama / Best Screenplay – Adapted / Best Supporting Actor / Outstanding Motion Picture Ensemble
4 / 11 Dreamgirls: Best Film – Musical or Comedy / Best Director & Sound / Best Supporting Actress
3 / 10 Flags of Our Fathers: Best Art Direction and Production Design / Best Cinematography & Director
2 / 3 The Devil Wears Prada: Best Actress – Musical or Comedy / Best Costume Design
2 / 4 The Queen: Best Actress – Drama / Best Screenplay – Original
1 / 1 Casino Royale: Best Original Song
1 / 1 Deliver Us from Evil: Best Documentary Film
1 / 1 Pirates of the Caribbean: Dead Man's Chest: Best Visual Effects
1 / 2 The Last King of Scotland: Best Actor – Drama
1 / 2 Running with Scissors: Best Actor – Musical or Comedy
1 / 3 Pan's Labyrinth (El laberinto del fauno): Best Animated or Mixed Media Film
1 / 4 To Return (Volver): Best Foreign Language Film
1 / 4 X-Men: The Last Stand: Best Editing
1 / 8 Babel: Best Original Score

Losers:
0 / 5 Little Miss Sunshine
0 / 4 Little Children
0 / 3 The Da Vinci Code, Notes on a Scandal, Thank You for Smoking, Venus
0 / 2 Aurora Borealis, The Black Dahlia, Changing Times (Les temps qui changent), Curse of the Golden Flower (Man cheng jin dai huang jin jia), The Fountain, Half Nelson, The House of Sand (Casa de Areia), The Lives of Others (Das Leben der Anderen), Marie Antoinette, A Prairie Home Companion, Stranger than Fiction, V for Vendetta

Television
Winners:
2 / 2 House, M.D.: Best Actor – Drama Series / Best Series – Drama
2 / 2 A Little Thing Called Murder: Best Actress – Miniseries or TV Film / Best TV Film
2 / 4 Ugly Betty: Best Series – Musical or Comedy Series / Best Supporting Actor – Miniseries or TV Film
1 / 1 Boston Legal: Best Actor – Musical or Comedy Series
1 / 1 The Closer: Best Actress – Drama Series
1 / 1 To the Ends of the Earth: Best Miniseries
1 / 1 Grey's Anatomy: Outstanding Television Ensemble
1 / 2 Desperate Housewives: Best Actress – Musical or Comedy Series
1 / 3 Dexter: Best Supporting Actress – Miniseries or TV Film
1 / 3 Gideon's Daughter: Best Actor – Miniseries or TV Film

Losers:
0 / 4 Studio 60 on the Sunset Strip
0 / 3 Bleak House, Elizabeth I, Mrs. Harris
0 / 2 24, Big Love, The Colbert Report, Entourage, The Office, Rescue Me, Thief, Weeds

References
 Satellite Awards – IMDb

Satellite Awards ceremonies
2006 awards
2006 film awards
2006 television awards